Pingree Grove is a village in Kane County, Illinois, United States. The population was 124 at the 2000 census. However, with rapid development in the following years, the 2010 census indicated 4,532 residents, and the 2020 census was 10,365.

Geography
Pingree Grove is located in northern Kane County. Neighboring communities are Hampshire to the west, Huntley to the north, Gilberts to the northeast, and the city of Elgin to the southeast. U.S. Route 20 passes through the village, leading northwest  to Marengo and southeast  into Elgin.

Demographics

2020 census

Note: the US Census treats Hispanic/Latino as an ethnic category. This table excludes Latinos from the racial categories and assigns them to a separate category. Hispanics/Latinos can be of any race.

2000 Census
As of the census of 2000, there were 124 people, 50 households, and 35 families residing in the village. The racial makeup of the village was 99.19% White, 0.81% from other races. Hispanic or Latino of any race were 4.03% of the population.

There were 50 households, out of which 18.0% had children under the age of 18 living with them, 56.0% were married couples living together, 6.0% had a female householder with no husband present, and 30.0% were non-families. 26.0% of all households were made up of individuals, and 14.0% had someone living alone who was 65 years of age or older. The average household size was 2.48 and the average family size was 2.89.

In the village, the population was spread out, with 16.9% under the age of 18, 8.1% from 18 to 24, 30.6% from 25 to 44, 25.0% from 45 to 64, and 19.4% who were 65 years of age or older. The median age was 42 years. For every 100 females, there were 90.8 males. For every 100 females age 18 and over, there were 98.1 males.

The median income for a household in the village was $45,313, and the median income for a family was $50,625. Males had a median income of $56,250 versus $26,071 for females, $19,345 more of a bigger gap than the state average. The per capita income for the village was $23,396. None of the population and none of the families were below the poverty line.

2010 earthquake

On February 10, 2010, Pingree Grove and the surrounding areas experienced an earthquake. The shock had a moment magnitude of 3.8 and a maximum Mercalli intensity of IV (Light). It was felt 214 km (134 miles) away in Madison, Wisconsin. When the quake was first reported, it was thought Sycamore was the epicenter. However, revised data from the USGS determined the epicenter to be closer to Virgil. This was the first earthquake in Northern Illinois since a M4.2 (intensity V (Moderate)) event in 2004.

References

External links
Official website

Villages in Illinois
Villages in Kane County, Illinois
Populated places established in 2007